Okni (mentioned in census records as Okni No. II, a census town) is a neighbourhood of Hazaribagh town in Hazaribagh district in the Indian state of Jharkhand.

Geography

Location

Demographics
As per the 2011 Census of India Okni had a total population of 11,106, of which 5,821 (52%) were males and 5,285 (48%) were females. Population below 6 years was 1,328. The total number of literates in Okni was 8,997 (92.01% of the population over 6 years).

As per 2011 Census of India, Hazaribagh Urban Agglomeration had a total population of 153,599, of which males were 80,095 and females 73,504. Hazaribagh Urban Agglomeration is composed of Hazaribagh (Nagar Parishad) and Okni (Census Town).

As per 2011 census the total number of literates in Hazaribagh UA was 122,881 (90.14 per cent of total population) out of which 66,602 (93.82 percent of males) were males and 56,279 (86.14 percent of females) were females.

 India census, Okni No.II had a population of 8,203. Males constitute 54% of the population and females 46%. Okni No.II has an average literacy rate of 78%, higher than the national average of 59.5%: male literacy is 81%, and female literacy is 74%. In Okni No.II, 14% of the population is under 6 years of age.

Infrastructure
According to the District Census Handbook 2011, Hazaribagh, Okni II covered an area of 0.85 km2. Among the civic amenities, it had 15 km roads with both open and closed drains, the protected water supply involved uncovered wells, tube well/ borewell, overhead tank. It had 1,767 domestic electric connections, 35 road lighting points. Among the educational facilities it had 7 primary schools, other educational facilities at Hazaribagh 3 km away. Among the social, recreational and cultural facilities, it had 3 public libraries, reading rooms.

See also
 Sadar, Hazaribagh (community development block)

References

Cities and towns in Hazaribagh district